This page provides the summary of RBBC1 Eastern European Qualifier/Finals. 

Since 2012, Red Bull BC One has held a qualifier for the World Final in the Eastern European Region. The winner advances to the Red Bull BC One World Final.

Winners

2015

RBBC1 Eastern European 2015 results
Location: Tbilisi, Georgia

Judges: 

 Pelezinho (Tsunami All Stars, Brazil)
 Lilou (Pockemon, France/Algeria)
 Mounir (Vagabonds, France) 

Individuals in bold won their respective battles.

2014

RBBC1 Eastern European 2014 results
Location: Zagreb, Croatia

Judges: 

 Hong 10 (Drifterz/7 Commandoz, South Korea)
 Yan the Shrimp (Allthemost, Russia)
 Lamine (France) 

Individuals in bold won their respective battles.

2013

RBBC1 Eastern European 2013 results 
Location: Kyiv, Ukraine

2012

RBBC1 Eastern European 2012 results
Location: St. Petersburg, Russia

Individuals in bold won their respective battles.

2011

RBBC1 Eastern European 2011 results
Location: Istanbul, Turkey

Individuals in bold won their respective battles.

External links
 Red Bull BC One Easter Europe Finals 2013

Red Bull BC One